Sainte-Justine is a municipality in the Les Etchemins Regional County Municipality in Quebec, Canada. It is part of the Chaudière-Appalaches region and the population is 1,835 as of 2009. It is named after Marie-Justine Têtu, wife to Hector-Louis Langevin, member of Parliament for Dorchester.

It is home to a regional secondary school, Polyvalente des Appalaches.

The famous Canadian short story The Hockey Sweater takes place in Sainte-Justine, the hometown of the author, Roch Carrier.

People linked to Sainte-Justine
 Roch Carrier, author
 Alex Tanguay, National Hockey League player
 Julie Labonté
 Étienne Lecours
 Chadou

References

External links

Commission de toponymie du Québec
Ministère des Affaires municipales, des Régions et de l'Occupation du territoire

See also
 Daaquam River, a stream
 Roche River (Daaquam River), a stream
 Onze River (Roche River), a stream
 Douze River (Roche River), a stream
 Moulin River (Roche River), a stream
 Famine River, a stream
 Les Etchemins Regional County Municipality (RCM)
 List of municipalities in Quebec

Municipalities in Quebec
Incorporated places in Chaudière-Appalaches